The following is an incomplete list of comic book series published by Harvey Comics.

A 
 Adventures in 3-D #1—2 (November 1953—January 1954)
 The Adventures of Felix the Cat #1 (May 1992)
 Alarming Adventures #1—3 (October 1962—February 1963)
 Alarming Tales #1—6 (September 1957—November 1958)
 All New Comics (October 1993)
 Alvin and the Chipmunks #1—5 (July 1992—May 1994)

B 
 Baby Huey
 Baby Huey and Papa
 Baby Huey Duckland
 Baby Huey, the Baby Giant
 [[Back to the Future (TV series)#Comic books|Back to the Future]] #1—4 (November 1991—June 1992)
 Beethoven #1—3 (March—July 1994, the first issue was an adaptation of the sequel film Beethoven's 2nd)
 Beetlejuice #1 (October 1991)
 Beetlejuice: Crimebusters on the Haunt Beetlejuice Holiday Special Beetlejuice in the Neitherworld Black Cat Comics Black Cat Mystery Blondie Bunny C 
 Captain 3-D Captain Flower Captain Freedom Casper and… Casper and Friends Casper and Nightmare Casper and Spooky Casper and The Ghostly Trio Casper and Wendy Casper in Space Casper Spaceship Casper Strange Ghost Stories Casper the Friendly Ghost Casper TV Showtime Casper's Ghostland Chamber of Chills Clown Comics D 
 Daisy and Her Pups #1—18 (July 1951—May 1954)
 Devil Kids Starring Hot Stuff #1—107 (July 1962—October 1981)
 F 
 Family Funnies #1—8 (September 1950—April 1951, continued as Tiny Tot Funnies from #9)
 Famous T.V. Funday Funnies #1 (September 1961)
 Felix the Cat First Love Illustrated (1949–1963)
 Fighting American Fighting Fronts! #1—5 (August 1952—January 1953)
 Flash Gordon #1—5 (October 1950—June 1951)
 Flat-Top The Flintstones The Flintstones: The Official Movie Adaptation in Double Vision (September 1994)
 Flip #1—2 (April—June 1954)
 Fruitman Special #1 (December 1969)
 Funny 3-D #1 (December 1953)
 G 
 The Green Hornet H 
 Hanna-Barbera Big Book #1 (June 1993)
 Hanna-Barbera Giant Size #1—3 (October 1992—October 1993)
 Harvey Collectors Comics Harvey Comics Hits Harvey Hits Harvey Hits Comics Herman and Katnip Hot Stuff the Little Devil Hot Stuff Creepy Caves Hot Stuff Sizzlers Hot Stuff the Little Devil Humphrey Comics #1—22 (October 1948—April 1952)
 I 
 In the Days of the Mob #1 (September 1971)
 The Incredible Crash Dummies #1—3 (November 1993—January 1994)
 Invisible Scarlet O'Neil J 
 Jackie Jokers #1—4 (March—September 1973)
 The Jetsons #1–5 (September 1992—November 1993)
 Jigsaw Joe Palooka Junior Funnies #10—13 (August 1951—February 1952, continued from Tiny Tot Funnies from #9)
 K 
 Kerry Drake L 
 Little Audrey Little Audrey and Melvin Little Audrey TV Funtime Little Dot Little Dot Dotland Little Dot's Uncles & Aunts Little Dracula #1—3 (January—May 1992)
 Little Lotta Little Lotta in Foodland Little Sad Sack M 
 Man in Black #1—4 (September 1957—March 1958)
 Mazie Monster in My Pocket Muppet Babies Mutt and Jeff N 
 NBC Saturday Morning Comics #1 (September 1991)
 New Kids on the Block #1—8 (December 1990—November 1991)
 Nightmare and Casper #1—5 (August 1963—August 1964)
 The Nine Lives of Felix the Cat #1—5 (October 1991—July 1992)
 P 
 Paramount Animated Comics #3—22 (February 1953—July 1956)
 Pebbles and Bamm Bamm Phantom Pink Panther Pocket Comics #1—4 (August 1941—January 1942)
 Popeye R 
 Race for the Moon #1—3 (March—November 1958)
 Rags Rabbit Richie Rich Richie Rich Adventure Digest Richie Rich and... Richie Rich and Billy Bellhops Richie Rich and Cadbury Richie Rich and Casper Richie Rich and Dollar The Dog Richie Rich and Dot Richie Rich and Gloria Richie Rich and His Girlfriends Richie Rich and His Mean Cousin Reggie Richie Rich and Jackie Jokers Richie Rich and New Kids on the Block Richie Rich and Professor Keenbean Richie Rich Bank Books Richie Rich Best of the Years Digest Richie Rich Big Book Richie Rich Big Bucks Richie Rich Billions Richie Rich Cash Richie Rich Cash Money Richie Rich Casper and Wendy National League Richie Rich Diamonds Richie Rich Digest Richie Rich Digest Stories Richie Rich Digest Winners Richie Rich Dollars and Cents Richie Rich Fortunes Richie Rich Gems Richie Rich Giant Size Richie Rich Gold and Silver Richie Rich Gold Nuggets Digest Richie Rich Holiday Digest Richie Rich Inventions Richie Rich Jackpots Richie Rich Meets Timmy Time Richie Rich Million Dollar Digest Richie Rich Millions Richie Rich Money World Richie Rich Money World Digest Richie Rich Profits Richie Rich Relics Richie Rich Riches Richie Rich Success Stories Richie Rich Summer Bonanza Richie Rich Treasure Chest Digest Richie Rich Vacation Digest Richie Rich Vacations Digest Richie Rich Vault of Mystery Richie Rich Zillionz Ripley's Believe It or Not! #1—4 (September 1953—March 1954)
 Romance Stories of True Love #45—52 (May 1957—November 1958, continued from True Love Problems and Advice Illustrated from #44) 
 S 
 Sad Sack and the Sarge Sad Sack Comics Sad Sack Laugh Special Sad Sack's Army Life Sad Sack's Funny Friends Sad Sad Sack World Saved by the Bell #1—5 (May 1992—May 1993)
 Scooby-Doo Speed Comics: 44 issues (Oct. 1939 – Jan./Feb. 1947)
 The Spirit Spitfire (Mahon) Spooky Haunted House Spooky Spooktown Spooky the Tuff Little Ghost Spyman Stone Protectors #0 + #1—3 (1993, May—September 1994)
 Stretch Stumbo Tinytown Stunt Dawgs Stuntman Comics Super Richie T 
 Tastee-Freez Comics #1—6 (1957)
 Tastee-Freez Junior Rocketeer Manual (1957)
 Teen-Age Brides #1—7 (August 1953—August 1954, continued as True Brides Experiences from #8)
 Thrill-O-Rama #1—3 (October 1965—December 1966)
 Thrills of Tomorrow #17—20 (October 1954—April 1955, continued from Tomb of Terror from #16)
 Time of Decision (1955)
 Tiny Tot Funnies #9 (June 1951, continued from Family Funnies from #8; continued as Junior Funnies from #10)
 Tom and Jerry #1—18 (September 1991—August 1994)
 Tom and Jerry 50th Anniversary Special #1 (October 1991)
 Tom and Jerry Adventures #1 (May 1992)
 Tom and Jerry and Friends #1—4 (December 1991—July 1992)
 Tom and Jerry Annual #1 (September 1991)
 Tom and Jerry Big Book #1—2 (September 1992—June 1993)
 Tom and Jerry Giant Size #1—2 (October 1992—October 1993)
 Tomb of Terror #1—16 (June 1952—July 1954, continued as Thrills of Tomorrow from #17)
 Top Notch Funnies (May 1959)
 Troll Patrol #1 (January 1993)
 True 3D #1—2 (December 1953—February 1954)
 True Bride to Be Romances #17—30 (April 1956—November 1958, continued from True Brides Experiences from #16)
 True Brides Experiences #8—16 (October 1954—February 1956, continued as True Bride to Be Romances from #17)
 True Love Problems and Advice Illustrated #1—44 (continued as Romance Stories of True Love from #45)
 True War Experiences #1—4 (August—December 1952)
 Tuff Ghosts Starring Spooky #1—43 (July 1962—October 1972)
 TV Casper and Company #1—46 (August 1963—April 1974)

 U 
 Ultraman Underdog Unearthly Spectaculars #1—3 (October 1965—March 1967)
 W 
 War Battles #1—9 (February 1952—December 1953)
 Wendy and the New Kids on the Block #1—3 (March—July 1991)
 Wendy the Good Little Witch Wendy Witch World Woody Woodpecker Y 
 Yogi Bear''

See also

 Harvey Comics
 List of Herman and Katnip cartoons
 List of The Flintstones media

References

Harvey Comics